Terri Sue "Tovah" Feldshuh (born December 27, 1948) is an American actress, singer, and playwright. She has been a Broadway star for more than four decades, earning four Tony Award nominations. She has also received two Emmy Award nominations for Holocaust and Law & Order, and appeared in such films as A Walk on the Moon, She's Funny That Way, and Kissing Jessica Stein. In 2015–2016, she played the role of Deanna Monroe on AMC's television adaptation of The Walking Dead.

Early life
Feldshuh is of Jewish heritage, the daughter of Lillian (née Kaplan) and Sidney Feldshuh, who was a lawyer. Her brother David Feldshuh is the Pulitzer Prize-nominated playwright of Miss Evers' Boys.

She was raised in Scarsdale, New York, in Westchester County, and graduated from Sarah Lawrence College. In her high-school years, she was a student at the National Music Camp (later named the Interlochen Arts Camp) as a star in their drama class. She studied acting at HB Studio in New York City.
She started her career under theater director Michael Langham at the Guthrie Theater, where she was awarded the McKnight Fellowship in Acting.

Career

Theater
Feldshuh appeared on the stage under the name "Terri Fairchild" before deciding to incorporate her Hebrew name and her original surname as her professional name, Tovah Feldshuh. She said of her name changes: "I fell in love with a Christian boy, Michael Fairchild, who didn't want to kiss a Terri Sue. He said: 'Terri Sue doesn't fit you at all. What's that other name of yours? Tovah? Now that's a name!" In 1994, she joked that she could have changed her name to "Goody Two-shoes", since tovah is Hebrew for "good", while Feldshuh translates from German as "field shoe".

She made her Broadway debut in the short-lived 1973 musical Cyrano starring Christopher Plummer. She appeared in the titular role in Yentl both off-Broadway at the Chelsea Theater Center and later on Broadway. Both productions are detailed in the book, Chelsea on the Edge: The Adventures of an American Theater, which describes tensions between Feldshuh and director Robert Kalfin over the play's interpretation.

Her other Broadway credits include Saravá,  Lend Me a Tenor, and Golda's Balcony -  William Gibson's work about the late Israeli Prime Minister Golda Meir. Golda's Balcony set a record as the longest-running one-woman play in Broadway history on January 2, 2005.

Feldshuh made her cabaret debut at the Algonquin Hotel Oak Room with her act, Tovah: Crossovah! From Broadway to Cabaret, which was followed by Tovah: Out of Her Mind! She took the latter show on the road to Philadelphia, Dallas, Houston, San Francisco, Los Angeles, Chicago, Hong Kong, and Sydney. The West End production sold out an eight-week run at the Duke of York's Theatre. The Boston Globe selected her as Best Cabaret Artist of 2000. In 2000, she co-wrote and performed in a one-woman play about actress Tallulah Bankhead titled Tallulah Hallelujah!

She returned to Broadway in the Dan Gordon play Irena's Vow in March 2009. She had appeared off-Broadway in this play in September 2008. In 2012, Feldshuh performed as Mama Rose in a revival of Gypsy.

At the September 21, 2013, Broadway performance of Pippin, Andrea Martin's last performance as Berthe (Pippin's grandmother) was announced to be the following day, and Feldshuh would be subsequently taking over the role. In 2014, she starred in Gypsy at the Bristol Riverside Theatre as Mama Rose.

In February 2015, she performed a one-woman show that she called Aging Is Optional at 54 Below.

In July 2022, it was announced that Feldshuh would replace Jane Lynch as Mrs. Brice in the Broadway revival of Funny Girl, beginning September 6, 2022.

Film and television
In 1973, Feldshuh appeared on television in a supporting role in Scream, Pretty Peggy. In 1976, she also had a supporting role in Ryan's Hope, and in the following year, she played Katharine Hepburn in The Amazing Howard Hughes. Also in 1977, she appeared on The Bob Newhart Show as Veronica Kidd, in an episode called "The Heartbreak Kidd" (season five, episode 18), which aired February 5.  However, Feldshuh came to international prominence as Helena Slomova in the 1978 miniseries Holocaust, based on Gerald Green's novel. Between 1991 and 2007, Feldshuh had a recurring role as defense attorney Danielle Melnick on NBC's Law & Order. (In 2018, Feldshuh was to reprise her role as Melnick, who would by then be a Cook County judge, in Dick Wolf's Chicago Justice, a companion program to his Chicago Fire, Chicago P.D., and Chicago Med that would be situated primarily in the Cook County, Illinois, court system.)

Feldshuh's feature-film appearances have included Lady in the Water, The Triangle Factory Fire Scandal, A Walk on the Moon, Happy Accidents, Brewster's Millions, The Idolmaker, The Blue Iguana, A Day in October, The Believer, Love Comes Lately, Just My Luck, and Kissing Jessica Stein. She also appeared as Ruthie in the 2004 film The Tollbooth.

Feldshuh appeared in Goyband, co-starring Adam Pascal, Amy Davidson, Cris Judd, Dean Edwards, Tibor Feldman, and Natasha Lyonne. She was also slated to star in the psychological thriller Acts of Mercy. In 2009, Feldshuh recorded the song "Bein Nahar Prat" for Pioneers for a Cure, with the proceeds benefiting Ellen's Run.

In 2012, she appeared as Mossad agent Rivka in the Covert Affairs episode "Wishful Beginnings". In 2014, she appeared in the film She's Funny That Way.

In March 2015, Feldshuh made her debut in a starring role on AMC's highly rated The Walking Dead. Feldshuh had never seen the show before being cast as former politician Deanna Monroe, whose character Feldshuh says she based on Hillary Clinton. She also appeared in the six-part miniseries Flesh and Bone, which debuted in 2015 on Starz.

From 2015 to 2019, Feldshuh had a recurring role on the musical comedy Crazy Ex-Girlfriend as Naomi Bunch, the image-conscious and hypercritical mother of the show's main character, Rebecca Bunch, played by Rachel Bloom.

Personal life

Feldshuh married New York attorney Andrew Harris Levy in 1977. Actress Ruth Gordon was her maid of honor. They have a son, Garson, an economist and graduate of Harvard and Oxford universities; and a daughter, Amanda, who graduated from the Massachusetts Institute of Technology. When Amanda married in 2014, Feldshuh gave her the advice, "You know how to have a successful marriage? Shut one eye, and don't leave. Some of it's fun and some of it isn't. It can be challenging, but you do not leave the field of play." Her nephew Noah Feldshuh is a member of alternative rock band X Ambassadors.

She lives on the Upper West Side of Manhattan.

For her charity work, she is the recipient of the Eleanor Roosevelt Humanities Award, Hadassah's Myrtle Wreath, and the Israel Peace Medal. The National Foundation for Jewish Culture honored her with the 2002 Jewish Image Award and the Performing Arts award in 2006.

When doing research for her role as Irene Gut Opdyke in the play Irena's Vow, Feldshuh traveled to Borshchiv, Ukraine, and discovered that her own ancestor, Moishe Feldshuh, had lived there in the early 20th century.

In March 2015, Feldshuh hiked Mount Kilimanjaro with her son. She explained to Variety she was inspired after the 2014 death of her mother at age 103, and her own athletic role in Pippin, in which she had to swing on a trapeze. "I really do feel we're only in this body once," she said. "I just want enough money to buy experience. I can forgo a dress, but the idea of taking a trip and trekking Mt. Kilimanjaro, or going on the Trans-Siberian railroad, or tracking lemurs in Madagascar — these things are very exciting to me. To see the world until I leave my own body. It's now or not at all."

Filmography

Films

Television

Theatre

Awards and nominations

Honors 

 1975: Honored as a Special Mention during Drama Desk Awards

Accolades

References

External links
 
 
 
 
 Tovah Feldshuh – Downstage Center interview at American Theatre Wing.org

1952 births
Living people
Actresses from New York City
20th-century American dramatists and playwrights
American film actresses
American stage actresses
American television actresses
Drama Desk Award winners
Jewish American actresses
People from the Upper West Side
People from Scarsdale, New York
Sarah Lawrence College alumni
American women dramatists and playwrights
20th-century American actresses
21st-century American actresses
Writers from Manhattan
Scarsdale High School alumni
20th-century American women writers
21st-century American Jews